Nozipho Schroeder (born 1 December 1951) is a South African lawn bowler.

Schroeder participated at the 2018 Commonwealth Games where she won a silver medal in the mixed para-sport pairs event.

References

1951 births
Living people
South African female bowls players
Bowls players at the 2018 Commonwealth Games
Commonwealth Games silver medallists for South Africa
Commonwealth Games medallists in lawn bowls
Medallists at the 2018 Commonwealth Games